Mohammad Mayeli Kohan (born 5 June 1953) is a retired Iranian football player and a current coach. He recently managed Malavan in Azadegan League.

Early life
He was born on 5 June 1953 in Bandar-e Anzali in Iran. His father was a farmer. He has two brothers and one sister.

Playing career 
He moved to Tehran in 1967 and joined Ghasre Yakh Club in 1969. He played there until 1974. From 1974 to 1976 he played at Naft Tehran. Mayeli Kohan then joined  Persepolis in 1976. His best time was in Perspolis. He retired from playing in 1990. He played for Iran national football team 6 times.

Coaching career

Assistantship
He was chosen as assistant manager of Perspeolis just months after his retirement in 1990 and became assistant manager of Iran national football team in 1991 by Ali Parvin.

Iran futsal
In 1992, he became head coach of Iran national futsal team and was in team's charge until 1995. Iran national futsal team became in Fourth place at 1992 FIFA Futsal World Cup with Mayeli Kohan.

Iran football
After good results with national futsal team, he was appointed as manager of Iran national football team after Stanko Poklepović's resignation. He coached team in 1996 AFC Asian Cup and was ranked in third place. He invited players such as Farhad Majidi, Khodadad Azizi and Ali Daei to the national team which team became Iran's best players in next years.

Iran Under-23
In 2003, Football Federation Islamic Republic of Iran appointed Mayeli Kohan as the head coach of Iran national under-23 football team. He resigned two months later to become the head coach of Iran Pro League side Saipa.

Saipa
He became head coach of Saipa in July 2003 replacing Giovanni Mei. He was head coach until the end of season which lead team in 13th ranked and team was relegated to the Azadegan League and Mayeli Kohan was sacked by the club.

Paykan
After his poor showing with Saipa, he was appointed as the head coach of Paykan in 2004. He had an unsuccessful stint with Paykan and resigned shortly after.

Foolad
He took a hiatus from coaching for two years but returned to manage Foolad in 2006. Foolad were relegated to Azadegan League a sharp decline from their previous season's 8th place finish. He was fired two days after the end of season.

Returning to Saipa
He was returned to Saipa in 2008 after Ali Daei became head coach of Iran national football team. During 2008–09 season, he received good results with Saipa and ended the season in 10th rank, finishing bad years of coaching. He was reappointed for two years by club chairman in 2009.Saipa F.C.'s last minute goal against Esteghlal F.C. in a game held in April 2009, threatened Esteghlal's chance of winning the Iranian title. After the game, because of fan clashes between the two teams and fan insults towards Mayeli Kohan and his family, Mayeli Kohan sent a letter to Esteghlal manager Amir Ghalenoei which reportedly included harsh references to Ghalenoei's height, facial appearance and background. When he was appointed as head coach of Iran national football team in 2009, he wasn't resigned as his position in Saipa and after he was refuse to coaching national team, he came back to Saipa. He was end 2009–10 season in 8th rank and 2010–11 season in 11th rank and was resigned as head coach of Saipa in the last match which they won and wasn't relegated to Azadegan League. After one of Saipa's games, when one of the reporters asked him about his great winning streak with Saipa 4 games in a row, Mayelikohan started to cry and couldn't give the reporter any answer

Appointment as Iran national team coach for second time

He was assigned as the new coach of Iran National football team on 7 April 2009 replacing Ali Daei who had been sacked a week earlier and was released on 21 April 2009.

As a result of conflicts with Amir Ghalenoei, an angered Ghalenoei, along several other Esteghlal players and officials including Fabio Januario, Farhad Majidi and Arash Borhani, stormed the IRIFF headquarters demanding an action to be made against Mayeli Kohan. Several days later Mayeli Kohan resigned without coaching Iran in any match.

Technical Manager of Persepolis
He was appointed as Technical Manager of Persepolis by Habib Kashani on 6 July 2011. He was resigned on 20 August 2011 after his deference with head coach.

Gahar Zagros
On 27 August 2012, Mayeli Kohan was appointed as head coach of Gahar Zagros, replacing with Mehdi Tartar who resigned last month. He returned to management after nearly two years. His side was relegated to the Azadegan League, just one year after their promotion. He left the team at the end of the season.

Saba Qom
On 30 May 2013, he signed a one-year contract with Saba Qom. His first match as head coach of Saba was a 1–0 win over Malavan.

Malavan
Mayeli Kohan became manager of newly  club Malavan on 21 July 2016.

Statistics

Honours

Player
Persepolis
Iranian Football League: 1975–76, 1976–77 (runner-up), 1977–78 (runner-up), 1989–90 (runner-up)
Hazfi Cup: 1987–88
Espandi Cup: 1979
Tehran Football League: 1982, 1986, 1987, 1988, 1989, 1990

Manager
Iran Futsal
FIFA Futsal World Cup: 1992 (fourth place)

Iran
AFC Asian Cup: 1996 (bronze medal)

Electoral history

References

External links

Mayeli Kohan ejected from the field during a football match Irannegah.com
Mohammad Mayeli Kohan Spiritual answer! Irannegah.com
Mayeli Kohan harshly criticises Firouz Karimi Irannegah.com

1953 births
Living people
People from Bandar-e Anzali
Association football midfielders
Iranian footballers
Iran international footballers
Persepolis F.C. players
Iranian football managers
Iran national football team managers
1996 AFC Asian Cup managers
Naft Tehran F.C. players
Persepolis F.C. non-playing staff
Islamic Azad University, Central Tehran Branch alumni
Iranian futsal coaches
Paykan F.C. managers
Foolad F.C. managers
Gahar Zagros F.C. managers
Iran national futsal team managers
Saba Qom F.C. managers
Malavan F.C. managers
Sportspeople from Gilan province
Persian Gulf Pro League managers